Fred Burnett (December 24, 1899 – February 9, 1962), nicknamed "Tex", was an American Negro league catcher and manager from the 1920s to the 1940s.

A native of Houston, Texas, Burnett broke into the Negro leagues in 1922 with the Pittsburgh Keystones. He went on to play for several teams, including the New York Black Yankees, whom he also managed for several years in the early 1940s. Burnett died in Los Angeles, California in 1962 at age 62.

References

External links
 and Baseball-Reference Black Baseball stats and Seamheads

1899 births
1962 deaths
Bacharach Giants players
Baltimore Black Sox players
Brooklyn Eagles players
Brooklyn Royal Giants players
Homestead Grays players
Indianapolis ABCs players
Lincoln Giants players
New York Black Yankees players
Newark Eagles players
Pittsburgh Keystones players
20th-century African-American sportspeople
Baseball catchers